Harvey Rishikof is an American lawyer who was the Convening Authority for the Guantanamo military commission in 2017 and early 2018.

Rishikof was the previous chair of the American Bar Association's Standing Committee on Law and National Security.  In 2020 he was a visiting professor at Temple University.

His past positions include:
 dean of the National War College;
 senior policy advisor to the Director of National Counterintelligence, ODNI;
 legal counsel for the deputy director of the Federal Bureau of Investigation;
 dean of Roger Williams University School of Law

Convening authority, Guantanamo
Rishikof and his deputy, Air Force Colonel Gary Brown were dismissed early in 2018.

A former prosecutor, Morris Davis, made a comparison between the Donald Trump Presidency and a sports team firing its coach.

Think about that for a moment. If a professional football team was on its seventh head coach and sixth quarterback in less than a dozen years, that team would almost certainly be a loser.

Richikof and Brown had been negotiating with the suspects' lawyers, offering to take the death penalty off the table, if they agreed to plead guilty, and accept a life sentence.

Publications

References

External links

Year of birth missing (living people)
Living people
American lawyers
Roger Williams University faculty